Dr. V. P. B. Paramasivam is an orthopedic doctor and politician who represented as a Member of the Legislative Assembly (MLA) from Vedansandur, Tamil Nadu during the 15th Tamil Nadu Assembly (2016-2021).

Personal life 
Dr. V. P. B. Paramasivam is married to a Government Service Pediatrician and has two sons. He has one brother(Dr. V. P. B. Maharajan) who is a General Surgeon and works with the Government of Tamilnadu Health Department.

Contribution to Medical Field 
VPB Memorial Ortho and Speciality Hospital was founded by Dr. V. P. B. Paramasivam at Pandian Nagar, Dindigul in memory of his late father V. P. Balasubramanian

Contribution as Member of Legislative Assembly 
Dr. V. P. B. Paramasivam brought in many new infrastructure development schemes for the constituency during his tenure

Contribution to Government and Governance 
Dr. V. P. B. Paramasivam was appointed as a member of multiple committees in the 15th Tamilnadu Legislative Assemblies.

Dr. V. P. B. Paramasivam was appointed as a member of the Fourth Police Commission, Tamilnadu in the year 2019.

Dr. V. P. B. Paramasivam was nominated for the Board of Management at Tamilnadu Veterinary and Animal Sciences University as the representative from 15th Tamil Nadu Assembly (2016-2021)

Elections contested

References 

Tamil Nadu MLAs 2016–2021
1980 births
Living people
Vokkaliga politicians
All India Anna Dravida Munnetra Kazhagam politicians